Atlantis: A Symphonic Journey is an album by David Arkenstone, released in 2004. The album is based on the legend of the lost civilization of Atlantis. Once again Arkenstone combines elements of new age and world music with an orchestral, cinematic flair.

Track listing

Personnel
 David Arkenstone – guitar, mandolin, drums, percussion, flutes, fretless bass, piano, keyboards
 Seth Osburn – conductor, percussion
 Harry Scorzo, Terry Glenny, J'anna Jacoby, Tom Vos, Lisa Dondlinger, Erlinda Romero – violin
 Alexis Carreon, Alma Fernandez, Briana Bandy – viola
 Peggy Baldwin, Ira Glansbeek – cello
 Cathy Larson – flutes
 David Kossoff – oboe, English horn
 Kourosh Zolani – santour
 John Wakefield – percussion
 Miriam Stockley – vocal performance and arrangements on tracks 2 and 10

References

2004 albums
David Arkenstone albums
Narada Productions albums